Perajarve is a settlement in Antsla Parish, Võru County in southeastern Estonia.

Perajärve is a populated place and is located in Antsla vald, Võrumaa, Estonia. The estimated terrain elevation above sea level is 102 metres. Variant forms of spelling for Perajärve or in other languages: Perayarve, Perajärve, Perajarve, Perajärve, Perayarve

References

External links 
Satellite map at Maplandia.com

Villages in Võru County
Antsla Parish